Zami Mohd Noor  (born 24 February 1972) is a former Malaysian football player.

Zami played for Kelantan FA, Negeri Sembilan FA, Malacca FA, Johor FC, Selangor Public Bank and Proton FC. He began his career with Kelantan as a striker before he converted to a sweeper while playing at Negeri Sembilan. He retired from football following a long-term injury.

Zami also played for Malaysia national football team, and was in the squad for the inaugural 1996 Tiger Cup tournament, where Malaysia finished as runner-up in the final against Thailand national football team.

Zami played for the Malaysia national football team at the 1997 South East Asian Games, where he scored a goal against the Philippines.

He also played for Malaysia national futsal team, and was in the squad that took part in the 1996 FIFA Futsal World Championship in Spain.

References

External links
 

1972 births
Living people
Malaysian footballers
Malaysia international footballers
Association football defenders
Association football forwards
Negeri Sembilan FA players